The 1998 All-Ireland Senior Club Camogie Championship for the leading clubs in the women's team field sport of camogie was won by Granagh-Ballingarry from Limerick, who defeated St Vincents from Dublin in the final, played at Ballingarry. It was the last club championship final to be played with 12-a-side.

Arrangements
The championship was organised on the traditional provincial system used in Gaelic Games since the 1880s, with Pearses and Leitrim Fontenoys winning the championships of the other two provinces. Eileen O'Brien, a student at St Mary’s, Charleville, was chief playmaker and scored 1–7 herself as Granagh-Ballingarry defeated three-in-a-row chasing Pearses from Galway in the semi-final. Louise Lynch, Denise O'Leary and Denise Smith scored St Vincent’s goals in the other semi-final.

The Final
Granagh-Ballingarry took an eight-point lead after 20 minutes of the final and went on to win by 11. Tom Humphries wrote in the Irish Times:  A crowd of about 3,500 made the journey to the tiny village of Ballingarry to see two sides with formidable CVs. Granagh-Ballingarry are the product of a merger in the late '70s but Ballingarry's record of success stretches back to the late 1920s and early '30s. St Vincent's are another amalgamation job, the Dublin giants Marino having thrown in their lot with the local GAA club a few years ago. St Vincent's escaped Leinster after years of trying this year and the method used was quick ground hurling. Pulling on the ball before it had time to nestle in the turf. They got to Limerick yesterday to find that the elements had conspired against them. The pitch was so heavy and sodden that it was a wonder the game was played at all. With the ball steadfastly refusing to move along the grass the home team produced the style of play designed to maximise home advantage. Jean Cullinane and Eileen O'Brien launched scores on the run from 30 and 40 yards out respectively. The confident execution put an end to all arguments. Niamh Cregan on the Vincents’ team was daughter of All-Ireland hurler, Eamon Cregan

Final stages

References

External links
 Camogie Association

1998 in camogie
1998